Trajan's Forum was the last of the Imperial fora to be constructed in ancient Rome. The architect Apollodorus of Damascus oversaw its construction.

History

This forum was built on the order of the emperor Trajan with the spoils of war from the conquest of Dacia, which ended in 106. The construction began between 105 and 107; according to the Fasti Ostienses the Forum was inaugurated in 112. Trajan's Column was erected and then inaugurated in 113.

To build this monumental complex, extensive excavations were required: workers eliminated a ridge connecting the Quirinal and Capitoline (Campidoglio) Hills. Over 300,000 cubic meters of soil and rock were excavated and dumped outside the Porta Collina.

It is possible that the excavations were initiated under Emperor Domitian, while the project of the Forum was completely attributed to the architect Apollodorus of Damascus, who also accompanied Emperor Trajan in the Dacian campaign.

During the time of the construction, several other projects took place: the construction of the Market of Trajan, the renovation of Caesar's Forum (where the Basilica Argentaria was built) and the Temple of Venus Genetrix.

Structure

The main entrance was at the south end of the piazza, through a triumphal arch at the center commemorating the Dacian Wars, decorated with friezes and statues of Dacian prisoners. The arch was flanked by tall walls built from blocks of Peperino tuff clad entirely in marble, which enclosed the Forum on three sides.

The tuff walls which enclosed the piazza to the west and east featured exedrae; outside the exedrae, separated by streets, were markets of concentric shape. The three-story eastern market, known as Trajan's Market, buttressed the excavated edge of the Quirinal Hill. The open space of the Forum measured about 300 feet by 380 feet, and was paved entirely in Carrara marble. Via a doorway in the far east wall of the Forum, one gained entry to an open courtyard with a portico, which communicated in turn with the adjacent Forum of Augustus.

Along the piazza's north side was the Basilica Ulpia, and north of that was a smaller piazza, with a temple dedicated to the deified Trajan on the far north side facing inwards. The position of – and very existence of – the temple dedicated to the deified Trajan is a matter of hotly contested debate among archaeologists, particularly clear in the ongoing debate between James E. Packer and Roberto Meneghini. Between the Basilica Ulpia and the terminal piazza containing the temple, were two libraries, one housing Latin documents and the other Greek documents.  Between the libraries stood the  Trajan's Column. The libraries housed state archives including the acts of the Emperors and the edicts of the praetors.

Trajan's successor Hadrian added a philosophical school adjacent to the piazza containing the Temple of Trajan. The building consisted of three parallel halls separated by annexes and was known as the Athenaeum; it functioned variously as school, a venue for judicial proceedings, and an occasional meeting-place for the Senate.

Constantius II, while visiting Rome in the year 357, was amazed by the huge equestrian statue of Trajan and by the surrounding buildings:

Post-Roman history
In the mid-9th century, the marble cobble blocks of the piazza were systematically taken for re-use, because of the good quality of the lime. They were replaced with concrete, showing that the piazza was still in use as a public space. By the 10th century the Imperial Fora were semi-rural, with a patchwork of houses and farmland crisscrossed by roads occupying the former plaza of Trajan's Forum. In the late-16th century, the whole area of the Imperial Fora, which by then lay 3–4 meters below ground, was built-up during a wave of urban expansion and the area became known as the Alessandrino district.

In 1526 the arch which formed the entrance to the Forum was demolished by the maestri di strade, Rome's Commissioners of Streets, which caused the Conservatore Francesco Cenci to submit a report to Rome's municipal government seeking redress for the destruction. Vestiges of the arch were found later in the century, including friezes which depicted scenes from the Dacian Wars, according to the descriptions of Flaminio Vacca.

In modern times only a section of the markets and the column of Trajan remain. A number of columns which historically formed the Basilica Ulpia remained on site, and have been re-erected. The construction of the Via dei Fori Imperiali in 1933 covered a number of these columns, which remain visible under the arches on which the road runs.

See also
Imperial fora
Roman Forum
Roman architecture
List of ancient monuments in Rome

Notes

Sources

External links
Roma – I Fori Imperiali (1995-2008). The Forum of Trajan. Excavations & Related studies (1998-2008). Prof. James. E. Packer, (ed. it.), Il Foro di Traiano a Roma. Breve studio dei monumenti (Roma 2001).
 Rome, Archaeology News: The Reappearance of the Temple of Trajan & The Athenaeum in Rome (September 2011).
 
High-resolution 360° Panoramas and Images of Trajan's Forum | Art Atlas

 
Imperial forums of Rome
Rome R. I Monti
Forum
Buildings and structures completed in the 2nd century
110s establishments in the Roman Empire